Machnovka (various spellings) is a Hasidic dynasty Chernobyl dynastic group of families.

It takes its name from the village Makhnivke in Ukraine, where its founder lived. Machnovka is an extant Hasidic group which survived the Holocaust. Its Hasidic court is now located in Bnei Brak, Israel.

Machnovka is also a sub-dynasty of Skver. It is a living legacy of the unique culture of the Polish and Ukrainian Jews and their Hasidic dynasties.

Lineage

The founder the Chernobyl dynasty was Rebbe Menachem Nachum Twersky of Chernobyl, a disciple of Rabbi Yisroel ben Eliezer, the Baal Shem Tov, who established the Hasidic movement

Grand Rabbi Menachem Nochum Twersky of Chernobyl - author of Meor Einayim, disciple of the Baal Shem Tov
Grand Rabbi Mordechai Twersky the "Maggid of Chernobyl", son of the Meor Einayim – had eight sons who each became a rebbe and started his own dynasty.
Grand Rabbi Yitschok Twersky of Skver, son of the Maggid of Chernobyl
Grand Rabbi Avraham Yehoshua Heshel Twersky (1826-1886) of Skver, son of Rabbi Yitschok
Grand Rabbi Yoseph Meir Twersky (1860- 29 Av 1917) of Machnovka, son of Rabbi Abraham Yehoshua Heshel of Skver
Grand Rabbi Menachem Nochum Twersky (1880-1945) of Skver-Machnovka, son-in-law of Rabbi Yoseph Meir of Machnovka
Grand Rabbi Avraham Yehoshua Heshel Twersky (24 Adar 1895 - 10 Tishrei 1987) of Machnovka-Bnei Brak, son of Rabbi Yoseph Meir of Machnovka
Grand Rabbi Yehoshua Rokeach (born 1949), current Machnovka-Rebbe of Bnei Brak, great-nephew of Rabbi Avraham Yehoshua Heshel of Machnovka

Rabbi Avrohom Yehoshua Heshel served as Machnifker Rebbe for 70 years, from 1917 to 1987. For many years in the USSR he defied the communist authorities by spreading the teachings of Judaism and Hasidism. After World War II he was invited by the Soviet authorities to serve as Chief Rabbi of the Soviet Union. His refusal to accept this position led to him being banished to Siberia. In 1965 he received permission to leave the Soviet Union and he emigrated to Bnei Brak, Israel.

Bibliography 
 Rabinowicz, Tzvi M. (ed.). The Encyclopedia of Hasidism. Northvale, NJ: Jason Aronson Inc., 1996.
 Grand Rabbis of Chernobyl (in Hebrew and English; Hebrew title: Admorei Malchus Beis Chernobyl), Flushing and Lakewood, New York: Genealogy Research Center of the Twersky Chernobyl Dynasty and the Makarov-Chernobyl Foundation, 2003.
 Rosenstein, Neil. The Unbroken Chain: Biographical Sketches and Genealogy of Illustrious Jewish Families from the 15th-20th Century, rev. ed. (2 vols.). New York, NY: CIS Publishers, 1990.

See also
History of the Jews in Poland
History of the Jews in Galicia (Central Europe)
History of the Jews in Ukraine

References 

Chernobyl (Hasidic dynasty)
Hasidic dynasties
Hasidic Judaism in Israel
Jewish Galician (Eastern Europe) history